Norma Margaret Plummer AM (born 24 November 1944) is a former Australian national player who also served as netball coach for both Australia and South Africa. She was coach of  Australia from 2003 to 2011, ending her coaching career with the Diamonds on 67 victories from 89 Tests — a success rate of 75 per cent. She was replaced as coach of Australia by Lisa Alexander. She was appointed a Member of the Order of Australia for her services to the sport. In November 2022 it is announced she will be returning to South Africa to coach the South Africa national netball side the Spar Proteas starting in 2022. The announcement  comes ahead of next years 2023 Netball World Cup that will be held in South Africa.

Early career
Norma Plummer began her career in 1967 and represented Australian Diamonds in 1972 with who she spent a decade which includes the win at the 1975 World Netball Championships in New Zealand.

She had a long and successful career as an Australian representative netballer, including a four-Test stint as national captain in 1978. After some time as playing coach of her state league team, Plummer embarked on a successful coaching career, coaching the Victorian state team to several victories at the national netball championships which was followed by her retirement from the team in 1982. and coaching the Melbourne Pumas in the Esso/Mobil Superleague.

After the Mobil Superleague was disbanded in favour of the new Commonwealth Bank Trophy, Plummer became the founding coach of the new Melbourne Phoenix team, which took many of the players from the former Pumas, and successfully coached them to the inaugural premiership. She was also appointed coach of the Australian youth team and took them to several successes. She subsequently resigned as coach of the Phoenix at the beginning of the 1999 season in order to take up a position as head netball coach at the Australian Institute of Sport. While in this role, she was integral in the campaign to add the AIS Canberra Darters to the national competition.

National coach
After several years as coach of the national youth team, and having been rumoured for the head national coach position since the late 1980s, Plummer was the obvious favourite when Jill McIntosh resigned in July 2003, and subsequently took the reins of the national team in late August. In her nearly three years as coach for the Australian team, she has retained her prior reputation as a hard coach willing to axe even star players if not performing, and remains widely respected, even with a downturn in the team's fortunes during 2005.

In June 2006 after the silver medal in March at the Commonwealth Games Norma Plummer led her young team to victory in all Test Match Series in 2006 & 2007 and in November 2007 won the World Championships in Auckland, New Zealand. 

In 2008 Plummer's team Australian Diamonds, had beaten Silver Ferns 53 to 51 at the Horncastle Arena and two years later won a silver medal at the 2010 Commonwealth Games in New Delhi. She also coached Australian national team at the 2011 Netball World Championships in Singapore.

Norma has announced that she will be coaching the West Coast Fever for season 2012.

In June 2015 Plummer became the head coach of the South Africa national netball team.

During the 2013 Australia Day honours, Plummer was appointed a Member in the General Division of the Order of Australia.

In 2014, after a 66–65 loss by her team West Coast Fever, which was playing in Dunedin at that time, a resident of the city had made death threats towards her on her personal webpage.

In 2018, Plummer had revealed that although she doesn't have a signed contract with the Netball South Africa, she will lead its national team to greatness at the 2019 Netball World Cup in Liverpool. She stepped down as the coach of South African team following the 2019 World Cup where South Africa ended up at fourth position.

References

External links
Speaker biography ICMI: Norma Plummer. Retrieved on 2009-03-28.
Wilson National profile: Normal Plummer. Retrieved on 2009-02-23.

Australian netball coaches
West Coast Fever coaches
Living people
1944 births
Australian Institute of Sport netball coaches
Australia international netball players
Members of the Order of Australia
Australia national netball team coaches
Netball players from Melbourne
Australian Netball League coaches
Melbourne Phoenix coaches
Commonwealth Bank Trophy coaches
ANZ Championship coaches
Esso/Mobil Superleague coaches
1975 World Netball Championships players
People from Carlton, Victoria